Copaifera panamensis, commonly known as the Cabimo is a species of flowering plant in the pea family, Fabaceae, that is endemic to Panama. It is threatened by habitat loss.

References

panamensis
Flora of Panama
Vulnerable plants
Taxonomy articles created by Polbot